Yves Rossy (born 27 August 1959) is a Swiss military-trained pilot and an aviation enthusiast. He is known as the inventor of a series of experimental individual jet packs, the latest using carbon-fiber wings for flight. Often referred to as "Jetman", Rossy has sometimes tested and presented new versions of his jetpacks in high-profile events staged around the world.

Early life and career 
Rossy was born in the Swiss canton of Neuchâtel in 1959. He served as a fighter pilot in the Swiss Air Force, where he flew Dassault Mirage IIIs, Northrop F-5 Tiger IIs, and Hawker Hunters. He piloted Boeing 747s for Swissair, and later for Swiss International Air Lines.

Jet wingpack
Rossy developed and built a wingsuit system comprising a backpack equipped with semi-rigid aeroplane-type carbon-fiber wings—with a span of about —powered by four Jetcat P400 jet engines, modified from large kerosene-fueled model aircraft engines. This has led to him being referred to in the press by various monikers, such as The Airman, Rocketman, Fusionman, and—most commonly—Jetman.

Developmental flights

In December 2006 (in Bex, Switzerland) Rossy became the first to successfully fly horizontally for six minutes using four jet engines and wings strapped on his back. He was quoted as saying: "The idea is to have fun, not to kill yourself".

Since 2007 Rossy has conducted some of his flight tests from a private airfield, Skydive Empuriabrava, in Empuriabrava (Girona, Costa Brava), Spain.

In November 2009 Rossy attempted a crossing of the Strait of Gibraltar, hoping to be the first person to fly between two continents using a "Jet pack". The flight was expected to take about a quarter of an hour. Strong winds and cloud banks forced Rossy to ditch into the sea just  from the Spanish coast, where his support helicopter picked him up ten minutes later, unhurt. The Spanish Coast Guard retrieved the jetpack, which was equipped with a parachute and float.

On 5 November 2010 Rossy flew a new version of his jet-powered flight system and successfully performed two aerial loops before landing via parachute.

On 7 May 2011 Rossy flew above the Grand Canyon in Arizona. The United States Federal Aviation Administration (FAA) had classified his flight system as an aircraft. When it finally granted him a license, the FAA waived the normal 25 to 40 hours of flight testing time, and Rossy acted quickly to complete his flight.

Latest media and event appearances 
Rossy was featured on an episode of Stan Lee's Superhumans. He has appeared on the BBC's Top Gear, where he raced Richard Hammond and Toni Gardemeister.

Rossy was a main attraction at the 2013 Experimental Aircraft Association AirVenture Fly-In, America's largest fly-in.

Rossy was also featured (not in person) in the South Australian Primary School's Music Festival in 2014, when the theme of the Festival was flight. The song, 'Jetman', was written by Paul Jarman about Yves Rossy.

October 2015 sustained flight
The flights were documented by the use of helmet-mounted cameras and third-party videos released in early November 2015. The videos show the pair soaring and diving around the airliner, flying in formation with it for about ten minutes.

A television program "City in the Sky, part 2" about how airliner flights are run, showed at its start Yves Rossy and Vince Reffet flying with Rossy-type jetpacks, to show some principles of how airliners fly. It said that before being allowed to jetpack-fly in Britain, he had to get himself registered as an airplane, because parts of his body, rather than parts of his jetpack, acted as control surfaces; but he was exempted from the seat-belt rule. It showed him being lifted to flying height on the outside of a helicopter. He had to fall a distance to build up enough air speed for his airfoils to work.

2020 Dubai Ground Takeoff
Rossy demonstrated, for the first time, the ability of his jetpack to perform a vertical takeoff and transition to sustained horizontal flight.

References

Citations

Sources

 Jet Man; Jetman Official website; accessed March 2014.
  "Bird? Plane? No, It's Jet Man". KNTV. 20 December 2006. Archived from the original on 12 October 2008.
  "Yves Rossy, "Jet Man", l'home a reacció". TV3 Catalonia. 25 October 2007. Archived from the original on 16 May 2016. Retrieved 28 August 2014.
  "Entrevistamos a Yves Rossy, el hombre pájaro en Skydive Empuriabrava". Vanity Fair. 22 July 2015. Retrieved 28 August 2015.
  Swiss 'Fusion Man' Flies Over the Alps with Jet-Propelled Wings; 15 May 2008 Fox News; accessed November 2015.
  Ormsby, Avril (26 September 2008). "'Fusion Man' makes historic Channel flight". Reuters.
  "Yves Rossy, 'Jetman,' Falls Into Sea Trying To Fly Between Continents". Huffingtonpost.com. 25 November 2009. Retrieved 18 May 2010.
  "BC News: Jetman Yves Rossy fails in Africa-Europe flight attempt". BBC News. 25 November 2009. Retrieved 18 May 2010.

External links

 Website of "Jet Man"
 TEDTalk Video
 Flying Above Dubai with Vince Reffet; 4K video.
 Emirates A380 and Jetman in Dubai Formation Flight; YouTube video by Emirates Airline.

1959 births
Living people
People from Neuchâtel
Swiss aviators
21st-century Swiss inventors
Swiss skydivers
Swiss military officers
Swiss Air Force personnel
Sportspeople from the canton of Neuchâtel